The 2023 FIA World Rally Championship-3 is the tenth season of the World Rally Championship-3, an auto racing championship for rally cars that is recognised by the Fédération Internationale de l'Automobile as the third-highest tier of international rallying. It is open to privateers and teams using cars complying with Group Rally3 regulations. The championship began in January 2023 with the Rallye Monte-Carlo and will conclude in November 2023 with Rally Japan, and runs in the support of the 2023 World Rally Championship.  The junior championship began in February with the Rally Sweden and the five-round championship will conclude in September with the Acropolis Rally.

Lauri Joona and Enni Mälkönen are the defending drivers' and co-drivers' champions.

Calendar

Entries
The following crews are set to enter into the 2023 World Rally Championship-3:

Results and standings

Season summary

Scoring system

FIA World Rally Championship-3 for Drivers

FIA World Rally Championship-3 for Co-Drivers

Notes

References

External links
  
 FIA World Rally Championship-3 2023 at eWRC-results.com

 
WRC-3
World Rally Championship-3